Margaretha van Mechelen (c. 1580 in Lier – 17 May 1662 in The Hague) was a noblewoman of the Southern Netherlands and (from c.1600 to c.1610) the mistress of Maurice of Nassau, Prince of Orange, with whom she had 3 sons:
Willem of Nassau, lord of the Lek
Louis of Nassau, lord of De Lek and Beverweerd
Maurice of Nassau (1604-1617)

Although Maurice refused to marry her (probably because she was a Catholic and only from the minor nobility), he did state his intent to do so from his death bed (and to legitimise and marry off their children).  This would threaten his half-brother Frederick Henry's place in the succession and so Frederick Henry summoned Amalia of Solms-Braunfels and married her a few days before Maurice's death.

External links
Portrait in the Digitaal Vrouwenlexicon

1580s births
1662 deaths
17th-century Dutch women
Dutch nobility
Van Mechelen, Margaretha